¡Qué madre tan padre! is a Mexican sitcom that aired on Las Estrellas from 25 January 2006 to 24 June 2006. It is produced by Jorge Ortiz de Pinedo and Pedro  Ortíz de Pinedo for Televisa. It stars Maribel Guardia and Mauricio Castillo.

Plot 
Mauricio is a father who works as an architect in a major company and his wife Maribel attends the home full time, although she has a marketing profession, specializing in sales. The couple has five children: Andrés, Jessica, Sebastián and the twins Luz y Liz. Mauricio loses his job and he can not be placed in another company. The need makes Maribel find work, she meets an old school friend, who has a multilevel sales company and offers her a very interesting employment opportunity. She accepts and soon becomes the economic support of the family, while Mauricio, little by little and with great difficulty, begins to take charge of domestic chores. Maribel's demanding job forces her to be home late, not be able to eat with her family, to forget a little about her children and to deal with the jealousy that Mauricio feels for Mike, who is her boss and friend. Mauricio is forced to take over the purchase of food, take the children to school, face housekeeping, pay for services, do homework, and cook.

Cast 
 Maribel Guardia as Maribel Galicia
 Mauricio Castillo as Mauricio Hernández
 Martha Ofelia Galindo as Doña Magos
 Lucila Mariscal as Doña Lucha
 Tamara Vargas as Sinforosa
 Ricardo Margaleff as Animal
 Jorge van Rankin as Mike Well
 Mauricio Herrera as Don Suegro
 Stephanie Casteele as Liz Hernández
 Kristel Casteele as Luz Hernández
 Mauricio Bueno as Sebastián Hernández
 María Chacón as Jessica Hernández
 Jorge Trejo as Andrés Hernández

Episodes

References

External links 
 

Las Estrellas original programming
Mexican television sitcoms
2006 Mexican television series debuts
2006 Mexican television series endings
Television series by Televisa